Gabríel  may refer to:

 Gabríel (rapper), Icelandic rapper
 Gabriel, an archangel

See also
Gabriel (disambiguation)